Dindica virescens is a moth of the family Geometridae first described by Arthur Gardiner Butler in 1878. It is found in Japan.

The wingspan is 35–42 mm.

The larvae feed on Lindera species.

References

Moths described in 1878
Pseudoterpnini
Moths of Japan